Liam Hatcher (born 17 September 1996) is an Australian cricketer. He made his List A debut for Cricket Australia XI on 5 October 2015 in the 2015–16 Matador BBQs One-Day Cup. He made his first-class debut for Cricket Australia XI on 29 October 2015 in a tour match against New Zealanders as part of New Zealand's tour to Australia.

In December 2015 he was named in Australia's squad for the 2016 Under-19 Cricket World Cup. He made his Twenty20 debut on 12 December 2020, for the Melbourne Stars, in the 2020–21 Big Bash League season.

References

External links
 

1996 births
Living people
Australian cricketers
Melbourne Stars cricketers
Cricket Australia XI cricketers
Cricketers from Sydney